Teddington Cemetery is a Grade II listed municipal cemetery in the north of Teddington in the London Borough of Richmond upon Thames. Opened in 1879 it has many tall, eclectic trees and its nucleus was the outcome of a competition for designs by Richmond Burial Board. 

It includes the war graves of 70 Commonwealth service personnel, 42 from World War I and 28 from World War II.

Above ground

Richmond Burial Board origins
Using the 1852 Burial Act, Richmond was enabled to form a burial board, and to buy and let out new burial grounds. A competition was announced to design the layout of the burial ground, with a first prize of 15 guineas and a second prize of 5 guineas

Landscaping and plants
The cemetery has many mature trees, some of them pre-dating the creation of the cemetery, such as cedar, weeping beech, holly, yew, cypresses, giant redwood, and a fine large monkey puzzle. Several cherry trees, probably the remains of the former orchard, are scattered in the lawns of the cemetery.

Most of the small roundabouts are planted with single cypresses surrounded by heather and lawn, as is the junction of the main and central east/west axes north of the chapels. The south-west has been partially cleared. The main path gives a view north to the two chapels, planted with a semi-mature deodar cedar to each side. Among southern trees and shrubbery is the ornate medieval style (neo-Gothic) mortuary of 1879.

The former western limit remains lined by trees. The perimeter path, lined with trees, was extended westwards by two paths linking the zone to the north-west added in  1950.

Paired chapels
The chapels, designed by T Goodchild in the Decorated Style, have crocketed spires linked by a great entrance arch. Built in 1878, their main material is dark honey-coloured Bargate ragstone with Bathstone dressings.

Notable burials

Neil Aspinall (1941–2008), former head of The Beatles' company Apple Corps
R D Blackmore (1825–1900), author, whose novels included Lorna Doone
John Sleeper Clarke (1833–1899), American comedian and actor, who lived in London from 1867
Francis de Havilland Hall (1847–1929), physician, surgeon, and laryngologist
Kenneth MacDonald (1950–2001), who played the character of Mike Fisher in the BBC television sit-com Only Fools and Horses
 James Messenger (1826–1901), who lived in Teddington and was the professional single sculls world champion from 1854 to 1857. He served as the Queen's Bargemaster from 1862 to 1901. At the time, he became the Champion of the Thames which was effectively the English Sculling Championship. After the English title gained the world status in 1876, earlier winners were retrospectively given the world champion title. In 1862 he won the famed Doggett's Coat and Badge race on The Thames.
Robert John Tozer (1813–1892), one of the founders of Christ Church in Teddington. He laid the keystone of the chapels in Teddington Cemetery.
 John Walter (1738–1812), founder of The Times.

Notes and references

External links
 Official website
 Teddington Cemetery map
 Find a Grave: Teddington Cemetery
 London Gardens Online: Teddington Cemetery
 Parks & Gardens UK: Teddington Cemetery

1879 establishments in England
Burials at Teddington Cemetery
Cemeteries in the London Borough of Richmond upon Thames
Commonwealth War Graves Commission cemeteries in England
Gardens in London
Gothic Revival architecture in London
Grade II listed buildings in the London Borough of Richmond upon Thames
Teddington